In the Battle of Fleurus (26 June 1794) Jean-Baptiste Jourdan's French army repulsed an attack by the combined Austro-Dutch army led by Prince Josias of Saxe-Coburg-Saalfeld. Tactically the battle was a draw but strategically it was a decisive French victory. The battle led to the collapse of the Coalition position in the Austrian Netherlands.

Key
 GdD = General de Division, army or division commander
 GdB = General de Brigade, division or brigade commander
 FM = Feldmarschall, army commander
 FML = Feldmarschall-Leutnant, column commander
 GM = General-major, brigade commander
 bns = infantry battalions
 sqns = cavalry squadrons
 Émigré = French Royalists

French army

General de Division Jean-Baptiste Jourdan (75,000)

 Reserve artillery
 Two foot artillery companies

Army of the Moselle
GdD Jean-Baptiste Jourdan
 GdD Jacques Maurice Hatry (11,000)
 GdB Jean-Antoine Chapsal
 27th Line Infantry Regiment, 1st Battalion
 44th Line Infantry Regiment, 1st Battalion
 Moselle National Guard, 2nd and 3rd battalions
 Côte-d'Or National Guard, 3rd Battalion
 Seine-et-Oise National Guard, 6th Battalion
 Doubs National Guard, 9th Battalion
 11th Dragoon Regiment, three squadrons
 18th Chasseurs à Cheval, one squadron
 GdB Jean Pierre François Bonet
 33rd Line Infantry Regiment, 2nd Battalion
 58th Line Infantry Regiment, 2nd Battalion
 Lot-et-Garonne National Guard, 1st Battalion
 Loiret National Guard, 2nd Battalion
 Var National Guard, 4th Battalion 
 One foot artillery company
 GdD Antoine Morlot (8,600)
 GdB Jean-Baptiste Olivier 
 110th Line Infantry Regiment, three battalions
 14th Dragoon Regiment, three squadrons
 GdB Henri Simon
 1st Line Infantry Regiment, three battalions
 34th Line Infantry Regiment, three battalions
 10th Cavalry Regiment, four squadrons 
 One foot artillery company
 GdD Jean Étienne Championnet (9,100)
 GdB Paul Grenier
 18th Line Infantry Regiment, three battalions
 1st Dragoon Regiment, three squadrons 
 GdB Claude Juste Alexandre Legrand
 59th Line Infantry Regiment, three battalions
 94th Line Infantry Regiment, three battalions
 4th Cavalry Regiment, three squadrons
 One foot artillery company
 GdD François Joseph Lefebvre (8,800)
 GdB Jean François Leval
 5th Line Infantry Regiment, 1st Battalion
 54th Line Infantry Regiment, 2nd Battalion
 99th Line Infantry Regiment, 2nd Battalion
 9th Foot Chasseurs Battalion
 GdB Jean-Baptiste Jacopin
 13th Line Infantry Regiment, three battalions
 80th Line Infantry Regiment, three battalions
 149th Line Infantry Regiment, three battalions
 GdB Jean Sultzmann
 16th Light Infantry Battalion
 1st Foot Chasseurs Battalion
 18th Foot Chasseurs Battalion
 Legion of the Moselle
 One foot artillery company

Army of the North
GdD Jean Baptiste Kléber
 GdB Guillaume Philibert Duhesme (10,000)
 GdB Jean Schlachter 
 Saint-Denis National Guard, 1st Battalion 
 Vosges National Guard, 5th Battalion
 4th Hussar Regiment, four squadrons
 12th Chasseurs à Cheval Regiment, five squadrons
 GdB Louis Fuzier
 47th Line Infantry Demi-brigade, three battalions
 Vienne National Guard, 2nd Battalion 
 Paris National Guard, 10th Battalion
 Seine-et-Oise National Guard, 10th Battalion
 GdB Jean-Baptiste Bernadotte
 56th Line Infantry Demi-brigade, three battalions
 32nd Light Infantry Battalion
 Orne National Guard, 1st Battalion 
 Meurthe National Guard, 2nd Battalion
 22nd Cavalry Regiment, four squadrons
 One foot artillery company
 GdD Anne Charles Basset Montaigu (8,200)
 GdB Joseph Léonard Richard 
 10th Light Infantry Battalion
 4th Foot Chasseur Battalion
 6th Cavalry Regiment, one squadron
 7th Dragoon Regiment, four squadrons
 16th Chasseurs à Cheval Regiment, one squadron 
 GdB André Poncet
 18th Line Infantry Demi-brigade, 1st Battalion
 49th Line Infantry Demi-brigade, 1st Battalion
 68th Line Infantry Demi-brigade, 1st and 2nd Battalions
 89th Line Infantry Demi-brigade, 1st Battalion
 GdB Joseph Boisset
 Calvados National Guard, 2nd Battalion 
 Haut-Rhine National Guard, 2nd and 3rd battalions
 Mayenne-et-Loire National Guard, 2nd Battalion 
 Nièvre National Guard, 2nd Battalion
 Eure National Guard, 3rd Battalion
 Somme National Guard, 5th Battalion 
 Oise National Guard, 6th Battalion
 Two foot artillery companies
 Detached from GdD Marie-Louis Ferrand
 GdB Charles Daurier (6,000)
 18th Line Infantry Demi-brigade, 2nd Battalion
 72nd Line Infantry Demi-brigade, 1st and 2nd battalions
 Loiret National Guard, 1st Battalion
 17th Cavalry Regiment, four squadrons
 One foot artillery company
 Cavalry Division: Paul-Alexis Dubois (2,300)
 GdB Jean-Joseph Ange d'Hautpoul
 12th Dragoon Regiment, four squadrons
 2nd Hussar Regiment, two squadrons
 6th Chasseurs à Cheval Regiment, four squadrons 
 One horse artillery company
 GdB Guillaume Soland
 6th Cavalry Regiments, four squadrons
 8th Cavalry Regiments, four squadrons
 One horse artillery company

Army of the Ardennes
GdD François Séverin Marceau-Desgraviers
 GdD Marceau (6,000)
 GdB Jean Thomas Guillaume Lorge
 9th Line Infantry Regiment, three battalions
 172nd Line Infantry Regiment, three battalions
 Nord National Guard, 3rd Battalion 
 Pas-de-Calais National Guard, 8th Battalion
 GdB Jean Hardy
 Vendee National Guard, 1st Battalion 
 Volunteers National Guard, 2nd Battalion
 11th Chasseurs à Cheval, four squadrons
 One foot artillery company
 GdD Jean Adam Mayer (5,500)
 GdB Jean Charles Prestat
 26th Line Infantry Regiment, three battalions
 Nord National Guard, 2nd Battalion 
 Seine-Inférieur National Guard, 7th Battalion
 GdB Claude Lecourbe
 16th Light Infantry Battalion 
 Aisne National Guard, 4th Battalion
 20th Chasseurs à Cheval, two squadrons
 One foot artillery company

Austrian-Dutch army

FM Prince Josias of Coburg (32,000 infantry, 14,000 cavalry)
 1st Column: William V, Prince of Orange
 Brigade: Lieutenant General Prince von Waldeck
 8 Dutch bns, 8 Dutch sqns, 2 Émigré sqns
 Brigade: Major General Prince Friedrich of Orange
 6 Dutch bns, 2 Swiss bns, 10 Dutch sqns, 2 Émigré sqns
 Brigade: GM Johann Sigismund Riesch
 2 Austrian bns, 3 Émigré bns, 2 Émigré sqns
 2nd Column: FML Peter Quasdanovich
 Brigade: 7 1/3 Austrian bns, 16 guns
 3rd Column: FML Franz Wenzel, Graf von Kaunitz-Rietberg
 Brigade: 5 Austrian bns, 3 Austrian sqns, 2(?) Émigré sqns, 16 guns
 4th Column: FML Archduke Charles
 Brigade: 7 1/3 Austrian bns, 16 sqns, 18 guns
 5th Column: FML Johann Peter Beaulieu
 Brigade: 16 Austrian bns, 20 Austrian sqns, 2 Émigré sqns, 18 guns

References

Further reading
The following are excellent sources for the first names and ranks of French and Austrian generals.

French Revolutionary Wars orders of battle
1794 in the Habsburg monarchy
1794 in the Holy Roman Empire
Flanders Campaign 1793–94